Willmanniella is a genus of mites in the family Parasitidae.

Species
 Willmanniella fallax Götz, 1969

References

Parasitidae